Robert Chapin (born April 3, 1964 in Miami, Florida) is a stunt, fight and swordplay choreographer, visual effects artist and supervisor, actor, writer, director, and producer. He is popularly known for acting in and creating the longest running action horror web series called The Hunted. He is also known for creating visual effects for American Beauty, Crouching Tiger, The Big Lebowski and X-Men. Chapin first starred in a film called Ring of Steel, of which he also wrote. As a fight choreographer and instructor, he is certified with the Societies of American, British, and Canadian Fight Directors. He has trained with stars such as Plácido Domingo, Robin Williams, David Hasselhoff, John Saxon, Marc Singer, Richard Grieco, Richard Lynch, Mike Norris, James Lew, Olivier Gruner, Jeff Conaway, Raye Hollitt, Tessie Santiago, and Angelica Bridges.

Early life, background and career
Robert Chapin was born on April 3, 1964 in Miami, Florida to a family of puppeteers, Leonora and Gerald Chapin. Chapin grew up making movies with brother, Stuart Chapin. Throughout his junior high and high school years, he attended drama and musical classes. In 1982, he received a music scholarship in Miami Dade Community College where he also took a course in Computer Science. At that same time, he also began training in stage combat and swordplay with a group that performed living chessgames called The Royal Chessmen at local fairs. Later on, he joined a jousting troupe called The Knights Arrant, and a small troupe called Ring of Steel, which performed sword fights at local theme park called Pirates. It was in this time that he met Matthew Gratzner, and Shannon Gans who created New Deal Studios in Los Angeles.

In 1985, he moved to Orlando, Florida. There, Chapin worked his way through college at the University of Central Florida by performing sword fights at a local dinner theater known as Shakespeare's Taevern. In 1986, Chapin's father died, but he continued his college until he graduated in 1987. Also at this time, he continued to take drama classes and choreographed sword fights for Romeo and Juliet.

Convinced by his brother, Chapin moved to Los Angeles where he worked as a swordsman on feature films such as Hook and Army of Darkness. In 1991, Chapin's mother died, two years before Bob wrote and starred in his first film, Ring of Steel, which was distributed by MCA Universal. Over the years, Chapin went on to star in several action films while building his credentials as an actor, stuntman, and fight coordinator. Also in this time, he began a career as a visual effects artist, using his skills and knowledge in computer science. He started with Pacific Data Images in Los Angeles, and then moved from one company to another. Chapin also worked with critically and widely acclaimed award-winning films such as X-Men, Fantastic Four, Armageddon, and American Beauty. He also headed several indie films before he became an in-house visual effects supervisor at New Deal Studios.

Chapin continuously kept up his acting and sword fighting skills. He trained for years with the infamous acting coach, Larry Moss, and was certified in six weapons as an actor-combatant in 1995 with the Societies of American, British, and Canadian Fight Directors at the First International Stage Combat Workshop in London, England.

In 2001, he co-created The Hunted with writer/actor Andrew Helm. The Hunted is one of the longest running web shows online.

Filmography
The following are the films and TV series or shows participated by Chapin as a visual effects artist or animator, actor, director, producer, and stunt and swordplay choreographer:

Awards and recognition
Awards

Recognition
Action Martial Arts Star of the Year (2003) by the Hawaii Martial Arts International Society

See also
The Hunted (web series)

References

External links
Robert Chapin - Official Website

Living people
1964 births
American male screenwriters
American male film actors
American television writers
American male television actors
American stunt performers
Visual effects artists
Visual effects supervisors
University of Central Florida alumni
Male actors from Miami
Action choreographers
American male television writers
Screenwriters from Florida